The Citadel Bulldogs men's tennis team represents The Citadel in the sport of tennis. The Bulldogs compete in NCAA Division I's Southern Conference (SoCon). The team hosts its home matches at the Earle Tennis Center on the university's Charleston, South Carolina campus, and are led by hall of fame coach Chuck Kriese.  The Bulldogs claimed their only SoCon Championship in 1961.  Individual Bulldogs have claimed 19 singles and 9 doubles at the SoCon championships.

References

Tennis
College men's tennis teams in the United States